Mind Bomb is the third studio album by English post-punk band The The. It was released by Some Bizzare/Epic on 11 July 1989 and recorded between October 1988 and May 1989. It is the band's first album to feature former The Smiths guitarist Johnny Marr.

The album peaked at No. 4 on the UK Albums Chart.

Overview
Matt Johnson assembled a full band of The The, retaining his role as singer, primary songwriter, frontman and guitarist (and playing keyboards and other instruments in the studio), and bringing in guitarist Johnny Marr. Johnson had known Marr since the early 1980s, and had attempted to entice him into an earlier version of The The prior to Marr forming The Smiths. Completing the lineup was former Julian Cope band bass guitarist James Eller and session drummer David Palmer (while D.C. Collard provided live keyboards). Additional instrumentation on Mind Bomb was provided by sessioneers, most notably keyboard player Wix.

Instead of the darkly polished dance-pop styling of earlier albums Soul Mining and Infected, Mind Bomb opens up the music to reveal a slow, winding textured world of sound, thanks in no small measure to Marr. Lyrical subjects include politics, religion, and romance. The band would also play a world tour and record a follow-up, Dusk. After that, Johnson dissolved it and went about his business alone again. A remastered version of the album was released in 2002.

Critical reception
The Quietus called the album "slow, expansive, looming into inexorable life with a rage that smouldered rather than flamed." The Encyclopedia of Popular Music called it "bombastic in tone and filled with lyrical diatribes and anti-religious rants allied to distinctly unmelodic songs." The Los Angeles Times called it "an embarrassing exercise in breast-beating," writing that "this bloated record is doubly distressing considering that it’s the work of the same man who turned out one of the most mysterious and lovely pop tunes of the ‘80s, 'Uncertain Smile'." In a retrospective review, Stylus Magazine wrote that "it’s easy to let the seemingly prescient relevance of the lyrics to Mind Bomb outweigh the actual music, which would be a shame because, with or without those words, it’s still a great record."

Track listing
Tracks written by Matt Johnson, except where noted.

 "Good Morning, Beautiful" – 7:28
 "Armageddon Days Are Here (Again)" – 5:40
 "The Violence of Truth" – 5:40
 "Kingdom of Rain" – 5:51
 "The Beat(en) Generation" – 3:04
 "August & September" – 5:45
 "Gravitate to Me" – 8:09 (Johnson, Johnny Marr)
 "Beyond Love" – 4:22

Personnel

The band
 Matt Johnson – vocals, guitar, keyboards
 Johnny Marr – guitar, harmonica
 James Eller – bass guitar
 David Palmer – drums

Additional musicians
 Sinéad O'Connor – female vocal on "Kingdom of Rain"
 Wix Wickens – piano, keyboards, Hammond organ, accordion
 Warne Livesey – keyboards, banjo, acoustic guitar
 Pandit Dinesh – percussion
 Danny Cummings – percussion
 Pedro Haldermann – percussion
 Chris White – saxophone
 Philip Todd – saxophone
 Ashley Slater – trombone
 John Eacott – flugel horn
 Mark Feltham – harmonica
 Danny Thompson – upright bass on "August & September"
 Sarah Homer – clarinet
 Dai Pritchard – bass clarinet
 Hilary Storer – oboe
 Gavyn Wright – Arabian fiddle
 Astarti String Section – strings

Artwork
Artwork and typography by Fiona Skinner. 
Photography Andrew MacPherson. 
Back cover image was created to reference photomontagist John Heartfield Der Sinn von Genf The Meaning of Geneva AIZ Cover, Berlin, Germany, 1932

Charts

References 

1989 albums
The The albums
Epic Records albums
Albums produced by Roli Mosimann
Albums produced by Warne Livesey